Cowania is a genus of parasitic flies in the family Tachinidae.

Species
Cowania wheeleri Reinhard, 1952

Distribution
Mexico.

References

Diptera of North America
Dexiinae
Tachinidae genera
Monotypic Brachycera genera